The True Vine ( hē ampelos hē alēthinē) is an allegory or parable given by Jesus in the New Testament.  Found in John , it describes Jesus' disciples as branches of himself, who is described as the "true vine", and God the Father the "husbandman".

Old Testament

The Old Testament passages which use this symbolism appear to regard Israel as faithful to God and/or the object of severe punishment. Ezek 15:1–8 in particular talks about the worthlessness of wood from a vine (in relation to disobedient Judah). A branch cut from a vine is worthless except to be burned as fuel. This appears to fit more with the statements about the disciples than with Jesus’ description of himself as the vine.

Ezek 17:5–10 contains vine imagery which refers to a king of the house of David, Zedekiah, who was set up as king in Judah by Nebuchadnezzar. Zedekiah allied himself to Egypt and broke his covenant with Nebuchadnezzar (and therefore also with God), which would ultimately result in his downfall (17:20–21). Ezek 17:22–24 then describes the planting of a cedar sprig which grows into a lofty tree, a figurative description of the Messiah. But it is significant that Messiah himself is not described in Ezekiel 17 as a vine, but as a cedar tree. The vine imagery here applies to Zedekiah's disobedience.

Is it a parable?

Several authors such as Barbara Reid, Arland Hultgren or Donald Griggs comment that "parables are noticeably absent from the Gospel of John". According to the Catholic Encyclopedia, "There are no parables in St. John's Gospel"; and according to the Encyclopædia Britannica, "Here Jesus' teaching contains no parables and but three allegories, the Synoptists present it as parabolic through and through." These sources all suggest that the passage is better described as a metaphor than a parable. Some writers, however, notably John Calvin, referred to the passage by a Latin term that is typically translated into English as a "parable".

Text
John 15:1–17 reads in the Douay–Rheims Bible:I am the true vine; and my Father is the husbandman. Every branch in me, that beareth not fruit, he will take away: and every one that beareth fruit, he will purge it, that it may bring forth more fruit. Now you are clean by reason of the word, which I have spoken to you. Abide in me, and I in you. As the branch cannot bear fruit of itself, unless it abide in the vine, so neither can you, unless you abide in me. I am the vine: you the branches: he that abideth in me, and I in him, the same beareth much fruit: for without me you can do nothing. If any one abide not in me, he shall be cast forth as a branch, and shall wither, and they shall gather him up, and cast him into the fire, and he burneth. If you abide in me, and my words abide in you, you shall ask whatever you will, and it shall be done unto you. In this is my Father glorified; that you bring forth very much fruit, and become my disciples. As the Father hath loved me, I also have loved you. Abide in my love. If you keep my commandments, you shall abide in my love; as I also have kept my Father's commandments, and do abide in his love. These things I have spoken to you, that my joy may be in you, and your joy may be filled. This is my commandment, that you love one another, as I have loved you. Greater love than this no man hath, that a man lay down his life for his friends. You are my friends, if you do the things that I command you. I will not now call you servants: for the servant knoweth not what his lord doth. But I have called you friends: because all things whatsoever I have heard of my Father, I have made known to you. You have not chosen me: but I have chosen you; and have appointed you, that you should go, and should bring forth fruit; and your fruit should remain: that whatsoever you shall ask of the Father in my name, he may give it you. These things I command you, that you love one another.

See also
 Christifideles laici
 I am (biblical term)
 Fruit of the Holy Spirit
 The Tree and its Fruits
 , heavenly grapevine in Mandaeism

Notes

External links

Vine
Vine
Gospel of John